The Kenya Certificate of Secondary Education (KCSE) is an academic qualification taken at the completion of secondary education in Kenya.

The first KCSE exam was held in 1989 at the same time as the last Kenya Advanced Certificate of Education (KACE), which it replaced as the entrance requirement for Kenyan universities.

The top students were Faith Wambui  (Ongata Rongaian national) in 2013 who got 96 to 100 of percentage mark and Naeem Samnakay in 1989, who had also been the top student in the first KCPE exam four years previously.

In 1989, the KCSE included 10 subjects, but was reviewed and changed to 7 subjects.

For grading, candidates must take all the three compulsory subjects, at least two sciences, one humanity and at least one practical or technical subject (see table above).

The KCSE examinations are taken under very strict supervision from invigilators to avoid cheating and run for a period of about one month. Cheating in these examinations attracts severe penalties from the Kenya National Examination Council, and students caught cheating get their grades cancelled.

The exams usually start in early November and end in late November. From December, the exam is graded and the results are released in late December the same year.

Examination results are announced to the public by the Minister for Education, and the top hundred students and schools are released to the media the day of the results announcement, online portals for checking results would be ready. School rankings are divided into the top 100 private schools, public schools and provincial schools.

The grading of the examination is as follows:

In Kenya, this examination is the entrance to public and private universities and the pass mark is grade C+. Students who attain a lower mark than C+ join other tertiary institutions for non-degree courses. Over time, stringent measures have been taken by the government to ensure and sustain the credibility of the KCSE examination. However, there have been instances of breaches of these measures leading to examination vices such as leakage to some selected students who if undetected end up scoring high grades. In detected cases, such students have been punished by having their results cancelled and examination officials who participated in the cheating charged in a court of law.

Each year, hundreds of thousands of students take the examination after four years of the Secondary School Course and this examination is a major determinant of the individual's future career. Since in 2018, a good grade guarantees one a place in one of the public or private universities in the country. Previous candidates didn't enjoy that opportunity.

Impact of COVID-19 in 2020

During the COVID-19 pandemic in 2020 and due to the surge in cases, the CS for Education, Professor George Magoha, postponed the certificate examinations to 2021 for 800,000 Form 4 candidates. It was done in March 2021. This was the first time in the history of Kenyan education for the exams to be postponed and the academic calendar cancelled.

See also
Joint Admissions Board of Kenya
Kenya Certificate of Primary Education
Kenya National Examination Council

References

External links 
 The Kenya National Examination Council
 online Kcse Results
 Internship and attachment in kenya
 Kenya Certificate of Secondary Education Information

Education in Kenya
Secondary school qualifications